"The Natural" is the third single released from Mic Geronimo's debut album, The Natural. The song was produced by Mark Sparks and featured Royal Flush. Like the album's previous two singles, it was more of an underground hit than a commercial success, becoming a minor hit on two Billboard charts.

Single track listing

A-Side
"The Natural" (Street)- 3:12
"The Natural" (Radio)- 3:12
"The Natural" (Instrumental)- 3:12
"The Natural" (A capella)- 3:12

B-Side
"Train of Thought" (Street)- 3:52
"Train of Thought" (Radio)- 3:52
"Train of Thought" (Instrumental)- 3:52

Charts

1995 singles
1995 songs
Mic Geronimo songs
TVT Records singles